Suzanne M. Prentiss (born October 6, 1964) is an American politician from Lebanon, New Hampshire. Prentiss is a Democratic member of the New Hampshire Senate, representing the 5th district. She has also served as a member of the Lebanon City Council since 2009 and served as mayor from 2017 to 2019.

References

Democratic Party New Hampshire state senators
21st-century American politicians
Living people
1964 births